Scott Lyman Jones (born September 22, 1983) is a Puerto Rican international footballer.

Career

College and amateur
Jones grew up in Dallas, Texas where he attended Jesuit College Preparatory School of Dallas. He then attended the University of North Carolina at Greensboro, playing on the men's college soccer team from 2003 to 2006.  He was a 2004 second team All American and a 2005 first team All American. In 2004, he began playing for the Carolina Dynamo of the USL Premier Development League during the collegiate off season.

Professional
On January 12, 2007, FC Dallas selected Jones in the third round (28th overall) in the 2007 MLS SuperDraft. Dallas announced they had signed Jones on March 28, 2007.  He played four games, scoring two goals, with the Dallas reserves, but saw no first team time. The team gave him a trial in February 2008, but he decided to leave on March 2, 2008. He signed with the Puerto Rico Islanders of the USL First Division that same year.

International
Jones was called up to the Puerto Rico national team in September 2011. As a United States citizen, he is eligible to the national team after residing in the Commonwealth for more than two years while playing with the Puerto Rico Islanders. He got his first cap in a 2014 FIFA World Cup qualification stage match against Saint Kitts and Nevis on September 2, 2011, which ended in a 0–0 draw.

Honors

Puerto Rico Islanders
Commissioner's Cup Winners (1): 2008
CFU Club Championship Winner (1): 2010

References

External links
 Puerto Rico Islanders bio
 
 

1983 births
Living people
Association football defenders
Association football midfielders
Puerto Rican footballers
Puerto Rico international footballers
Soccer players from San Antonio
UNC Greensboro Spartans men's soccer players
North Carolina Fusion U23 players
FC Dallas players
Puerto Rico Islanders players
Charlotte Eagles players
USL League Two players
USL First Division players
USSF Division 2 Professional League players
North American Soccer League players
USL Championship players
FC Dallas draft picks
All-American men's college soccer players
Jesuit College Preparatory School of Dallas alumni